Lechner Racing, formerly known as Walter Lechner Racing is an auto racing team based in Austria. It is also known as the Lechner Racing School. Lechner Racing has established the Porsche Sprint Challenge Middle East and organizes the series as a subcontractor of Porsche AG.

History

Sports car racing
Walter Lechner Racing competed in the Interserie in the 1990s and developed their own car in conjunction with Reynard Motorsport, the Lechner Spyder SC91. Since then, the team has actively competed in the Porsche Supercup series since 2003. They won their first Teams' Championship title in 2005 and two more followed in 2007 and 2008. In 2005, the team won both trophies as Alessandro Zampedri collected the Drivers' Championship with a win at the Circuit de Catalunya. Drivers such as Richard Westbrook, Damien Faulkner, Danny Watts and Patrick Huisman have also driven for the team over the years and were successful, winning many races. In 2009 the team failed to win a race, although Štefan Rosina came in third place in the overall drivers' standings.
Furthermore, in 2011 Lechner Racing achieved a great success by claiming Double Pole and Double Podium during the Porsche Carrera World Cup with more than 100 cars participating.
Since 2009, Lechner Racing is to appointed contractor of the Porsche AG to organize the Porsche GT3 Cup Challenge Middle East which is running in Bahrain, Abu Dhabi, Dubai, Qatar and Saudi Arabia.
The Porsche GT3 Cup Challenge Middle East quickly established itself as the most professional and successful one-make GT series in the Middle East.
With the organization based at the Bahrain International Circuit, "The Home of Motorsport in the Middle East", the GT3 Cup Challenge Middle East is located in the perfect environment in terms of motorsport facilities.
Ever since its inaugural season in 2009/2010 the GT3 Cup Challenge Middle East is offering an ideal platform for the Arab world's most promising circuit racing drivers to broaden their racing experience on the region's most appealing race tracks.
Based on the highly successful Porsche formula for one-make series racing the challenge gives every driver an equal chance to compete, racing in identically constructed Porsche GT3 Cup cars.
The upcoming ninth season will thereby see the introduction of the new Porsche GT3 Cup car type 991. As the first international Porsche one-make series the Porsche GT3 Cup Challenge Middle East will be running with the newest GT3 Cup car version following its inauguration during the Porsche Mobil 1 Supercup 2017.
Based on the "Arrive and Drive" concept the championship is not only aiming at young talents but similarly gives Gentlemen drivers the opportunity to combine their passion for motorsport with their daily routines and compete in an own category.
Upon arrival at the race track the drivers can directly get into their racing gear and step into a perfectly prepared Porsche GT3 Cup car and start racing.

Former Series Results

ADAC Formula 4

† Shared results with other Team

Italian F4 Championship

Timeline

References

External links

Austrian auto racing teams
Porsche Supercup teams
Formula Renault Eurocup teams
International GT Open teams
German Formula 3 teams
Porsche in motorsport
World Sportscar Championship teams
Auto racing teams established in 1975